Gage is a surname. Notable people with the surname include:

Business and industry
Alfred S. Gage 1860-1928, American rancher and businessman in Texas
Daniel Gage, New England ice harvester
John Gage (born 1942), Vice President of Sun Microsystems

Entertainment
Ben Gage (1914–1978), American television actor
Dave Gage, American harmonica player and instructor
Kevin Gage (born 1958), American actor
Mary Leona Gage, Miss USA 1957
Patricia Gage, British actress and voice actress
Pierre Gage, Quebec musician
Ryan Gage, Actor

Literature and academics
Alexandra Gage, Viscountess Gage (born 1969), British lecturer
Leighton Gage (1942–2013), American writer
Nicholas Gage (born 1938), Greek-American writer

Military and naval
Henry Gage (soldier) (1597–1645), soldier in the English Civil War
Richard Gage (soldier), Union soldier in the American Civil War
Thomas Gage (1719–1787), a British general in the American Revolution

Politics and government
Frances Dana Barker Gage, suffragist and women's rights leader
Fred Kelton Gage (1902-1951), American lawyer and politician
George Gage, 7th Viscount Gage (1932–1993)
Henry Gage (1852–1924), American governor of California
Henry Gage, Viscount Gage, several people with this name and title
Jack R. Gage (1899–1970), American governor of Wyoming
John Gage (Tudor politician), politician of the Tudor period in England
Kelly Gage (1925-2017), American lawyer and politician
Lyman Gage (1836–1927), financier and US Secretary of the Treasury
Matilda Joslyn Gage (1826–1898), women's suffrage activist
Nicolas Gage, 8th Viscount Gage (born 1934)
Richard Gage (architect), leader of the group Architects & Engineers for 9/11 Truth
Viscount Gage, any of several Irish nobles holding that title
Sir William Gage, 7th Baronet (1695–1744)
William Gage, 2nd Viscount Gage (1718–1791)

Religion
Thomas Gage (clergyman) (c. 1597 – 1656), English clergyman
W.D. Gage, Nebraska minister, namesake of Gage County, Nebraska

Science and technology
Andrew Thomas Gage (1871–1945), Scottish botanist and surgeon
Fred Gage, American professor of genetics
Julia C. Gage, American cancer epidemiologist 
Linda Gage, American demographer
Nathaniel Gage (1917–2008), American educational psychologist
Phineas Gage (1823–1860), American railroad construction foreman whose personality was changed by an accident that destroyed part of his brain
Simon Henry Gage (1851–1944), American professor of anatomy, histology, and embryology
Susanna Phelps Gage (1857–1915), American embryologist and comparative anatomist
Thomas Gage (botanist) (1781–1820), British botanist
Walter Gage (1922–1978), Canadian mathematics professor

Sports
Bobby Gage (1927–2005), American football player
Ethan Gage, (born in 1991), Canadian soccer player
Joaquin Gage (born 1973), Canadian ice hockey goaltender
Jody Gage (born 1959), Canadian ice hockey forward
Justin Gage (born 1981), American football wide receiver
Kevin Gage (footballer), (born in 1964), English football (soccer) player
Matt Gage (born 1993), American baseball player
Nick Gage, professional wrestler
Russell Gage (born 1996), American football player
Jason Gage   (Born 1986)

Other
Jetseta Gage (1994–2005), American victim of kidnap and murder
Margaret Kemble Gage, alleged spy, wife of General Thomas Gage